Rezaabad (also Romanized as Rez̤āābād) is a village in Baghin Rural District, in the Central District of Kerman County, Kerman Province, Iran. At the 2006 census, its population was 63, in 11 families.

References 

Populated places in Kerman County